S. Venkatesan also known as Su. Venkatesan is a Tamil writer from Tamil Nadu, India and Tamil Nadu State Committee member of CPI(M). Venkatesan is a state committee member of the Party and a whole-timer of the Party. He is the state president of Tamil Nadu Progressive Writers and Artists Association.

Writing
He was conferred the Sahitya Academy Award for his Tamil novel Kaval Kottam. His recent book Vel Pari was widely well-received among the public. He is well known in the literary field and is popular among general public. His debutant novel Kavalkottam published in 2008 was awarded the Sahitya Akademi Award for Tamil in 2011. The film Aravaan is based on it. His second novel Veera Yuga Nayagan Velpari was serialised in Tamil popular magazine Ananda Vikatan. He is the general secretary of the Tamil Nadu Progressive Writers and Artists Association.

Political career
S. Venkatesan joined the communist party CPI(M) and is a Member of Parliament from Madurai. Su Venkatesan who contested from Madurai parliamentary constituency secured 4,47,075 (44 per cent) votes defeating his nearest rival (AIADMK candidate) by a margin of  1,34,119 votes." S. Venkatesan contested as CPI(M) candidate in the 2019 Indian general election from Madurai. He was elected to the Lok Sabha with a margin of 1.39 Lakhs of votes.

Awards
In 2010, his historical novel Kaval Kottam received the Fiction Award from The Tamil Literary Garden, Canada. The next year, it got him the prestigious Sahitya Academy Award on the following year.

See also
 List of Indian writers

References

Writers from Madurai
 
Tamil writers
Living people
21st-century Indian novelists
Novelists from Tamil Nadu
Indian historical novelists
Telugu people
India MPs 2019–present
1970 births